Jia Rui  (born February 18, 1987), is a retired professional wushu taolu athlete from Macau. He was one of the most dominant wushu taolu athletes of the 2000s and the early 2010s, and won the first gold medal for Macau at the Asian Games.

Career

Early career 
Jia started practising wushu taolu at the age of five. In 2003, the 17-year-old Jia travelled to Macau through a foreign exchange programme between the Chinese Wushu Association (CWA) and the Macau wushu team. Jia then entered the Macau Polytechnic Institute (IPM) while training wushu intensively.

2005-2010 
Jia’s international debut was at the 2005 East Asian Games where he won a gold medal in changquan, a silver medal in the daoshu and gunshu combined event, and a bronze medal in duilian. He then competed at the 2005 World Wushu Championships where he won a silver medal in daoshu and a bronze medal in gunshu. With these achievements, the Macau SAR government awarded Jia a certificate of merit. At the 2006 Asian Games the following year, he won the silver medal in men's changquan all-around. A year later at the 2007 World Wushu Championships, he became the world champion in gunshu and won a silver medal in daoshu. The same year, it was also arranged for him to participate in the torch relay for the 2008 Summer Olympics.

With his victories in the world championships, he qualified for the 2008 Beijing Wushu Tournament, where he earned the silver medal in the men's daoshu and gunshu combined event. That same year, he was a triple medallist at the Asian Wushu Championships. Returning to the East Asian Games in 2009, he achieved the same result of a gold medal in changquan and a silver medal in daoshu and gunshu. That same year at the 2009 World Wushu Championships, he was the world champion in daoshu and also won two silver medals in changquan and gunshu. A year later, Jia competed at the 2010 World Combat Games and won the gold medal in the changquan event. A few months later at the 2010 Asian Games, he made history by winning the first gold medal for Macau at the Asian Games, doing so in the daoshu and gunshu combined event.

2010-2014 
Following his win at the Asian Games, he competed in the 2011 World Wushu Championships and once again was the world champion in gunshu and additionally won two silver medals in changquan and daoshu. A year later, he won a gold medal in daoshu and a bronze medal in gunshu at the 2012 Asian Wushu Championships. A year later at the 2013 East Asian Games, he won two gold medals in his speciality events and a bronze medal in duilian. He was also the world champion in gunshu for the third time at the 2013 World Wushu Championships. Jia's last major international competition was at the 2014 Asian Games where he won a silver medal in changquan. He subsequently retired from competition and began coaching young athletes.

Honours 
Awarded by the Macau SAR Government

 Honourific Title of Merit: 2005
 : 2007
 : 2013

Macau Outstanding Athletes Election

 Honorary Athletes Awards: Elected 2007, 2009, 2011, 2013
 Most Popular Athletes: Bronze Award (2011)

See also 

 List of Asian Games medalists in wushu
 Macau at the Asian Games

References 

1987 births
Macau wushu practitioners
Chinese wushu practitioners
Wushu practitioners at the 2006 Asian Games
Wushu practitioners at the 2010 Asian Games
Wushu practitioners at the 2014 Asian Games
Competitors at the 2008 Beijing Wushu Tournament
Medalists at the 2006 Asian Games
Medalists at the 2014 Asian Games
Medalists at the 2010 Asian Games
Asian Games gold medalists for Macau
Asian Games silver medalists for Macau
Asian Games medalists in wushu
Living people